Luca Scassa (born 23 August 1983 in Arezzo) is an Italian motorcycle racer who is a Ducati Corse test rider. He previously competed in the MotoGP World Championship, the Superbike World Championship the Supersport World Championship, the AMA Superbike Championship and the British Superbike Championship. He was the Italian Superbike champion in 2008 riding a MV Agusta. In 2022 FIM Endurance World Championship he rides for Italian based No Limits Motor Team in superstock category.

Career
Having competed between 2004 and 2007 in the Superstock 1000 FIM Cup, he became Italian Superbike champion in 2008 with the MV Agusta F4 312 R with team Unionbike Gimotorsports. In the same year he made his debut in the World Superbike Championship as a replacement rider for the DF Racing Team at the circuit of Portimão, scoring no points.

2009
In 2009 he participated in the World Superbike Championship with a Team Pedercini Kawasaki ZX-10R. He finished his first full season in twenty-ninth place overall with 11 points, his best finish being thirteenth, in race 1 in the French Grand Prix held at Magny-Cours.

2010
On February 16 it was announced that he would take part in the World Superbike 2010 championship with Ducati 1098R Team Supersonic Racing. In the course of the season Scassa was forced to miss the first race in Australia at Phillip Island, and again in Silverstone because of a fall in race 1 at Brno which caused the fracture of the 3rd and 4th metatarsal of his left foot. Even with these problems he still managed to improve his results of the previous year, ranking in seventeenth place in the riders' championship with 85 points.

2011
For 2011, he joined the Supersport World Championship riding a Yamaha YZF-R6 for Team ParkinGO, managing three wins during the season and finishing in 5th place in the standings; during the year he was forced to miss the weekend at Misano by disqualification for making an illegal test with a production bike on the same track. A few weeks earlier his 'Scassa Racing Experience School' was instructing riders at the Misano circuit using Yamaha R1's, and although not the same R6 motorcycle Scassa used in the championship, the rules of the WSS Championship clearly stated unless the team designated such track as a test circuit they could not use the facility.

2012
For 2012, he joined the British Superbike Championship, racing a Honda CBR1000RR for the Padgetts Racing team. He had a season of ups and downs especially on the new, unfamiliar circuits, a 4th place at Assen was his best finish. He finished the season in 15th place with 76 points.

2013
For 2013, he returned to the World Supersport championship riding the Kawasaki ZX-6R Kawasaki for team Intermoto Ponyexpres. In September 2013 it was announced that Scassa would stand-in for an injured MotoGP rider Karel Abraham as part of the Cardion AB team for the Aragon race. This would be his first-ever ride for a MotoGP team. After finishing 17th in his first GP it was announced that Scassa would be replacing Abraham for the rest of the 2013 season.

Career statistics

Superbike World Championship

Races by year
(key) (Races in bold indicate pole position, races in italics indicate fastest lap)

Supersport World Championship

Races by year
(key) (Races in bold indicate pole position, races in italics indicate fastest lap)

Grand Prix motorcycle racing

By season

Races by year
(key) (Races in bold indicate pole position, races in italics indicate fastest lap)

References

External links

1983 births
British Superbike Championship riders
Italian motorcycle racers
Living people
Sportspeople from Arezzo
Superbike World Championship riders
Supersport World Championship riders
MotoGP World Championship riders
FIM Superstock 1000 Cup riders